Juncus dubius is a species of rush known by the common name wrinkled rush. It is endemic to California, in the California Coast Ranges, Transverse Ranges, and southern Sierra Nevada. It is a common member of the flora in many wet areas, such as marshes and riverbanks.

Description
Juncus dubius is a perennial herb growing in thick tufts from a horizontal rhizome. The stem is erect and green and has a distinctive wrinkled, rippled surface. It reaches a maximum height near 70 centimeters. There are few leaves, those growing at the base lacking blades and appearing as sheaths around the stem, and those further up the stem having cylindrical blades.

The inflorescence is open, with spreading branches holding many small clusters of a few flowers each. There are small, clear bracts. Each flower has reddish or brownish green tepals with thin, transparent margins, and bristles at the tip. There are six stamens.

The fruit is a red or brown capsule which is larger than the flower in which it grows.

References

External links
Jepson Manual Treatment — Juncus rugulosus
Juncus rugulosus — U.C. Photo Gallery
Researchlearningcenter: photo gallery

dubius
Endemic flora of California
Flora of the Sierra Nevada (United States)
Natural history of the California chaparral and woodlands
Natural history of the Mojave Desert
Natural history of the Peninsular Ranges
Natural history of the San Francisco Bay Area
Natural history of the Santa Monica Mountains
Natural history of the Transverse Ranges
Plants described in 1881
Flora without expected TNC conservation status